Allahudien Paleker (born 1 January 1978) is a South African cricket umpire and former cricketer of Maharashtrian descent with roots tracing back to Ratnagiri district in Maharashtra. He is now an umpire and has stood in matches in the 2015–16 Ram Slam T20 Challenge. He is part of Cricket South Africa's umpire panel for first-class matches.

In November 2017, he was promoted to the ICC International Panel of Umpires. He stood in his first Twenty20 International (T20I) match, between South Africa and India at Centurion Park, on 21 February 2018. On 19 January 2019, he stood in his first One Day International (ODI) match, between South Africa and Pakistan at St George's Park.

In October 2019, he was appointed as one of the twelve umpires to officiate matches in the 2019 ICC T20 World Cup Qualifier tournament in the United Arab Emirates.

Paleker made his debut as an umpire in Tests when he took the field for the match between South Africa and India at the Wanderers Stadium in Johannesburg from 3–7 January 2022.

See also
 List of Test cricket umpires
 List of One Day International cricket umpires
 List of Twenty20 International cricket umpires

References

External links
 

1978 births
Living people
South African cricketers
South African cricket umpires
South African Test cricket umpires
South African One Day International cricket umpires
South African Twenty20 International cricket umpires
Northerns cricketers
Western Province cricketers
Sportspeople from Cape Town
South African people of Indian descent